Coronavirus deaths may refer to:

 List of deaths from the 2019–20 coronavirus pandemic, a list of notable people
 2019–20 coronavirus pandemic deaths, statistics on the numbers of deaths